Campanula napuligera is a herbaceous perennial native to the Pyrenees, Alps, and Carpathians. Campanula napuligera is a short and slender, rhizomatous perennial in the bellflower family (Campanulaceae).

napuligera
Flora of the Pyrenees
Flora of the Alps
Plants described in 1866
Flora of the Carpathians